Drumore Township is a township in southwestern Lancaster County, Pennsylvania, United States. At the 2020 census the population was 2,568.

It is named after Dromore (Irish: Droim Mór), County Down, now in Northern Ireland, with which it has been twinned since 1996.

Geography
It includes the communities of Liberty Square, Chestnut Level, Fernglen, Drumore, Furniss, and Fairfield, and parts of the communities of Buck and Henzel.

Demographics

As of the census of 2000, there were 2,243 people, 739 households, and 597 families residing in the township.  The population density was 93.8 people per square mile (36.2/km).  There were 819 housing units at an average density of 34.3/sq mi (13.2/km).  The racial makeup of the township was 98.75% White, 0.27% Black or African American, 0.09% Native American, 0.09% Asian, 0.27% from other races, and 0.53% from two or more races.  0.71% of the population were Hispanic or Latino of any race.

There were 739 households, out of which 38.8% had children under the age of 18 living with them, 71.7% were married couples living together, 5.4% had a female householder with no husband present, and 19.2% were non-families. 16.4% of all households were made up of individuals, and 6.2% had someone living alone who was 65 years of age or older.  The average household size was 3.04 and the average family size was 3.44.

In the township the population was spread out, with 32.0% under the age of 18, 8.6% from 18 to 24, 27.9% from 25 to 44, 22.5% from 45 to 64, and 9.1% who were 65 years of age or older.  The median age was 34 years. For every 100 females, there were 104.3 males.  For every 100 females age 18 and over, there were 106.5 males.

The median income for a household in the township was $47,250, and the median income for a family was $51,645. Males had a median income of $36,366 versus $22,560 for females. The per capita income for the township was $17,470.  About 4.0% of families and 5.1% of the population were below the poverty line, including 7.2% of those under age 18 and 6.5% of those age 65 or over.

Parks and recreation

Drumore Township Park
The land was purchased from the John O’Donnel farm with grant money from the county.

The Park is open to the public each day of the week from sun up to sun down.

Susquehannock State Park

Fishing Creek
Fishing Creek Nature Preserve is a  preserve of mature forest along fishing creek, a creek that runs into the Susquehanna River.  The creek is one of the few places in Lancaster County where a natural trout population remains.  A dirt road runs along the stream, and there are several trails through the woods.

Schools
Drumore Township is served by the Solanco School District. Schools in the district are:

Solanco High School
585 Solanco Road, Quarryville, PA 17566
(717)786-2151

George A. Smith Middle School
645 Kirkwood Pike, Quarryville, PA 17566
(717)786-2244

Swift Middle School
1866 Robert Fulton Highway, Quarryville, PA 17566
(717)548-2187

Providence Elementary School
137 Truce Road, New Providence, PA 17560
(717)786-3582

Quarryille Elementary School
211 South Hess Street, Quarryville, PA 17566
(717)786-2546

Clermont Elementary School
1868 Robert Fulton Highway, Quarryville, PA 17566
(717)548-2742

Bart Colerain Elementary School
1336 Noble Road, Christiana, PA 17509
(717)529-2181

Notable people
 William Whipper, abolitionist
 John Steele, Brigadier General

References

External links

Populated places established in 1729
Townships in Lancaster County, Pennsylvania
Townships in Pennsylvania
1729 establishments in Pennsylvania